Deadwater Drowning is the only EP by American deathcore band Deadwater Drowning. It was released along with Bare As Bones by Backstabbers Incorporated and Dulling Occams Razor by Found Dead Hanging as the inaugural releases of Black Market Activities on July 15, 2003.

Track listing

Credits 

The album was recorded by band member Jonny Fay and mastered by Nick Zampiello and Josh Galeos.

References 

2003 EPs
Deadwater Drowning albums
Black Market Activities EPs